Blastococcus saxobsidens  is a Gram-positive and aerobic bacterium from the genus of Blastococcus which has been isolated from calcarenite in Malta.

References

 

Bacteria described in 2004
Actinomycetia